Yanardag (born 1991), is an Akhal-Teke stallion owned by the former President of Turkmenistan, Saparmurat Niyazov. The stallion is depicted on the coat of arms of Turkmenistan, on a 2001 miniature sheet Turkmenistan postage stamp, and in other Turkmen national representations, and he is also often featured in newspaper and magazine articles.

Biography and representations 
Yanardag is an Akhal-Teke horse bred by Geldy Kyarizov, and foaled in Turkmenistan in 1991, the year of Turkmenistan's independence from the Soviet Union.  Yanardag was named world champion of the breed in 1999 in Moscow, and was subsequently acquired by Saparmurat Niyazov, who was President of Turkmenistan 1990–2006.

He is described on the official Turkmenistan webpage on Akhalteke horses as having a "unique golden-dun colour, characteristic for all Akhalteke horses". According to the Akhal-Teke Association of America, "golden dun", called Bulanaya, is the color buckskin, produced by the cream gene, sometimes overlaid with sooty shading. While bulanaya is the Russian word for the color called buckskin in the USA, bulanaya is sometimes translated "dun" when using an outdated British English term for diluted colors.   There are no Akhal-Tekes registered as savrasaya (the Russian word for the dun color) in the Russian stud books.  

A lifelike image of Yanardag, in a sphere of blue, has been the central figure of the coat of arms of Turkmenistan since 2003. His image is also on a 2001 Turkmenistan postage stamp, and on the reverse of the 2005 50-manat note.  
In 2014 a monument to Yanardag was completed and unveiled in Turkmenistan's capital city of Ashgabat.

References

External links 
 Yanardag at official Turkmenistan webpage on Akhalteke horses

1991 animal births
Akhal-Teke horses
Animals in politics